Two vessels of the Royal Navy have been named HMS Corso:
 was a Spanish brig-sloop that  captured on 12 February 1796. She was on harbour duty from March 1803. The Navy sold her on 1 September 1814.
HMS Corso was a  destroyer of the Royal Navy, ordered as Corso during the Second World War, and was built by John I. Thornycroft & Company, Southampton. She was launched on 14 May 1945, renamed  in June 1946, and commissioned on 20 December 1946. In 1949, she was involved in the Amethyst Incident. She was broken up in October 1962.

Royal Navy ship names